Western Hill is a community in the city of St. Catharines, Ontario, Canada. It borders highway 406 to the north, Regional Road 72 to the south, the Twelve Mile Creek to the east, and Louth St to the west,.

Bordering neighborhoods are Vansickle to the west, Downtown and Martindale to the north, Glenridge to the east, and Power Glen to the south.

Neighbourhoods in St. Catharines